John W. Vanderpoel (born October 11, 1949) is an American birdwatcher, birding guide, and author born in the Chicago suburb of Des Plaines Illinois. With a degree in biology focusing on ornithology Vanderpoel completed a birding Big Year in 2011 where he saw 744 bird species in North America, placing him one species away from the all-time record. His book Full Chase Mode details his adventures during 2011.

Personal life and education
John Vanderpoel was born in Des Plaines, a northwest Chicago suburb, to Ruth and Waid Vanderpoel. His father was a well-respected financier and conservationist whose love of nature was passed down to John. Vanderpoel was also the great nephew of noted painter John Vanderpoel. John attended Barrington High School and the University of Colorado Boulder, where he studied biology.

Birding
Vanderpoel was the producer of the Advanced Birding Video Series, which released Small Gulls of North America, Large Gulls of North America, and Hummingbirds of North America.

Works
Full Chase Mode, John Vanderpoel, Buteo Books, 2021, 
Hummingbirds of North America, John Vanderpoel, Larry Rosche, and Jon L Dunn, Peregrine Video Productions, 2004
Small Gulls of North America, John Vanderpoel, Larry Rosche, and Jon L Dunn, Peregrine Video Productions, 1999
Large Gulls of North America, John Vanderpoel, Larry Rosche, and Jon L Dunn, Peregrine Video Productions, 1997

References

External links
 John Vanderpoel | Birding North America | 2011 | Big Year
  Queztal Birding Tours

1949 births
University of Colorado alumni
John W
American conservationists
Living people
People from Des Plaines, Illinois